The videography of South Korean group Twice consists of thirty-nine music videos, one film, seventeen video albums, twenty-nine DVDs and fifty-two reality shows.

Music videos

Films

Video albums

DVDs

Reality shows

Notes

References

External links 
 Official channel on YouTube

Videography
Twice